Diego Ignacio Schalper Sepúlveda (born 14 March 1985) is a Chilean politician currently serving as a member of the Chamber of Deputies, representing District 15 of the O'Higgins Region since 2018. He is a member of centre-right party National Renewal.

References

1985 births
Living people
Members of the Chamber of Deputies of Chile
People from Santiago
Pontifical Catholic University of Chile alumni
Free University of Berlin alumni
University of Marburg alumni
National Renewal (Chile) politicians
21st-century Chilean politicians